Lo Háras Otra Vez is the first album in Spanish by American contemporary worship band Elevation Worship. The album was released on August 18, 2017 through its own imprint label, Elevation Worship.

Track listing

NOTE:  These songs are Spanish-language translations of Elevation Worship songs in English.  The original English-language song is listed next to each title.

Chart performance

References

2017 albums
Spanish-language albums
Elevation Worship albums